The 2003–04 season was Paris Saint-Germain's 34th season in existence. PSG played their home league games at the Parc des Princes in Paris, registering an average attendance of 38,810 spectators per match. The club was presided by Francis Graille and the team was coached by Vahid Halilhodžić. Frédéric Déhu  was the team captain.

Competitions

Overview

Ligue 1

League table

Results summary

Results by round

Matches

Coupe de France

Coupe de la Ligue

References

External links

Official websites
PSG.FR - Site officiel du Paris Saint-Germain
Paris Saint-Germain - Ligue 1 
Paris Saint-Germain - UEFA.com

Paris Saint-Germain F.C. seasons
Paris Saint-Germain